The Men's Allam British Open 2019 was the men's edition of the 2019 British Open Squash Championships, which is a PSA World Series event (Prize money : 165,000 $). The event takes place at the new Sports Complex at the University of Hull in Hull in England from 20 to 26 May.

Mohamed El Shorbagy defeated Ali Farag in an all Egyptian final, which saw El Shorbagy win the title for the third time.

Seeds

Draw and results

Semi-finals and final

Main Draw

Top half

Bottom half

See also
2019 Women's British Open Squash Championship
2018–19 PSA Men's World Squash Championship

References

Men's British Open
Men's British Open
British Open Squash
Men's British Open Squash Championships
Men's sport in the United Kingdom
Sport in Kingston upon Hull
Squash in England
2010s in Kingston upon Hull